Pocket Listing is a 2016 American neo-noir black comedy film directed by Conor Allyn, written by James Jurdi, and starring Jurdi, Logan Fahey, Caitlin Gerard, Christos Vasilopolous, Jessica Clark, Rob Lowe, and Burt Reynolds. The film was acquired by Metro-Goldwyn-Mayer and Orion Pictures for limited theatrical and video on demand release on December 2, 2016.

It has been described as a "darkly comic crime thriller" which centers on "the story of a former hot-shot Los Angeles property broker who is given a second chance by a corrupt power couple with a commission to sell their Malibu mansion, a deal riddled with criminal activity.

Plot
Set around the issue of the U.S. real-estate market and its various casualties, Frank Hunter (Rob Lowe) and his sultry wife Lana (Jessica Clark) hire disgraced Los Angeles property broker Jack Woodman (James Jurdi) to discreetly market and sell their Malibu villa. Fired from a top broker firm by real-estate mogul Ron Glass (Burt Reynolds) and framed by his menacing, drug-addled son, Aaron (Logan Fahey), Woodman soon finds himself in a world of double crosses, mistaken identity and crooked deals, the type that are literally life or death.

Reception

Critical Responses
Ben Gummery of Battle Royale with Cheese wrote: "This plays like a ‘Wolf of Wall Street‘ tale for the L.A. property market however in the third act this turns into more of a Cohen-brothersesque dark comedy of betrayal and adultery" and ended his review by writing that "this is a fun little flick."

Weetas wrote that the film is one of the essential movies about real estate. "Another thriller that takes place in the real estate arena, this great movie ... is part thriller and part black comedy, it shows the shady side of huge real estate deals...it is very entertaining to watch."

Steve Cook of the American Genius wrote that "It’s a hip new Hollywood offering with an edgy story line about money, greed, power, sex, revenge, redemption, and real estate. In that order...Set in Malibu and featuring such well-worn talent as Rob Lowe and Burt Reynolds, the flick is a racy shoot‘em up about an extraordinary villa with a pool that seems to flow off the edge of a cliff into a Malibu arroyo."

Cast
 Rob Lowe as Frank Hunter
 Burt Reynolds as Ron Glass
 James Jurdi as Jack Woodman
 Jessica Clark as Lana Hunter
 Logan Fahey as Aaron Glass
 Noel Gugliemi as El Cabron
 Ken Davitian as Mr. Mousian

References

External links
 
 
 

2016 films
2016 black comedy films
2010s crime thriller films
Metro-Goldwyn-Mayer films
Orion Pictures films
2016 independent films
American independent films
American business films
American crime comedy-drama films
American crime thriller films
American neo-noir films
American black comedy films
American satirical films
Adultery in films
Films set in Los Angeles
Films about con artists
Films shot in Los Angeles
2010s business films
2010s crime comedy-drama films
Films about financial crises
Fiction with unreliable narrators
Films shot in California
2010s English-language films
2010s American films